Mickey Zucker Reichert (born as Miriam Susan Zucker in 1962) is an American fantasy fiction author of several best selling novels.

Personal life 
Reichert is a pediatrician, and holds a Doctorate of Medicine (M.D.). She is from a town in Iowa. She and her husband have fostered and adopted children, as well as a variety of animals "from mice to horses".

Her novels are published by DAW Books; the organisation published her first novel via Sheila Gilbert, who is still Reichert's editor over 25 years later.

Zucker-Reichert is an experienced and passionate wildlife rescuer. Her snaring techniques were involved in the rescue the endangered gopher tortoise. Seeing that it could outrun her, she created advanced snaring methodology and techniques that are now utilized to save the species from extinction.

Notable works 
Reichert has published more than 22 novels, an illustrated novella, and more than 50 short stories.

Renshai series 
She is known for her Renshai series, which provides a different perspective on traditional Norse mythology. It is the story of a battle between good vs evil vs neutrality. It focuses around Norse mythology. The story largely centers around the survivors from a tribe of master swordsmen that are decimated in a coordinated attack by the majority of their neighboring countries, and a few other characters.

These three books focus on the character of Colbey Calistinsson in addition to other characters that play central roles in the storyline. Colbey is the most skilled swordsman the Renshai tribe has ever known. Yet, after his tribe is almost completely eradicated, he is forced to search for purpose and also determine a new course for his existence. Otherwise the evil forces of the East will destroy the neutral forces of the West in the Great War that is prophesied to plunge more than half of the continent in a violent war.

Later in the series Colbey acquires powerful telepathic and psychic abilities. This, he discovers in the third book, stems from his heritage. Colbey is in fact the son of Thor, the Norse God of Thunder, and the grandson of Odin, King of the Norse Gods. He is the son of a god and a mortal woman from a mighty warrior tribe (Renshai). However, true to character, he is undaunted by this knowledge, and soldiers on through many quests with his sense of purpose and his dedication to only do what he feels is right regardless of the consequences - even if it may possibly result in the Ragnarok and bring about the end of the world. Eventually, he marries the goddess Freya.

I, Robot 
Reichert was asked to write three prequels of I, Robot by Isaac Asimov's estate. She first met Asimov when she was 23, although she did not know him well. She is the first female author to be authorized to write stories based on Asimov's novels; follow-ups to his Foundation series were written by Gregory Benford, Greg Bear, and David Brin. The prequels were ordered by Berkley Books.

Bibliography

References

1962 births
Living people
20th-century American novelists
21st-century American novelists
American fantasy writers
American women novelists
Pseudonymous women writers
Women science fiction and fantasy writers
20th-century American women writers
21st-century American women writers
20th-century pseudonymous writers
21st-century pseudonymous writers